Maurice Ford (born 6 September 1996) is a Trinidadian international footballer who plays for W Connection, as a defender.

Career
He has played club football for W Connection.

He made his international debut for Trinidad and Tobago in 2016.

References

1996 births
Living people
Trinidad and Tobago footballers
Trinidad and Tobago international footballers
W Connection F.C. players
Association football defenders
2015 CONCACAF U-20 Championship players
Footballers at the 2015 Pan American Games